Stites & Harbison is a law practice with offices in Louisville, Lexington, Covington and Frankfort, Kentucky; Jeffersonville, Indiana; Nashville, Memphis and Franklin, Tennessee; Atlanta, Georgia; and Alexandria, Virginia.  U.S. News & World Report and Best Lawyers listed Stites & Harbison among America's Top 25 Law Firms in construction litigation.

References

External links
 

Companies based in Louisville, Kentucky
Law firms established in 1832
1832 establishments in Kentucky
American companies established in 1832
Law firms based in Kentucky